Complètement fou ("Completely crazy") is the third studio album by French electropop group Yelle. It was released on 29 September 2014 in France, and worldwide on 2 October 2014.

Track listing

Charts

References

External links
 Yelle official site

2014 albums
Yelle albums
Because Music albums
Kemosabe Records albums
Albums produced by Cirkut
Albums produced by Dr. Luke